Rieber may refer to:

People
 Hanna Rieber (1927–2014), Romanian-born Israeli actress
 John Ney Rieber, an American comic book writer
 Paul-Christian Rieber (born 1958), a Norwegian business leader 
 Torkild Rieber (1882–1968), a Norwegian immigrant to the United States who became chairman of Texaco
 Georg Fredrik Rieber-Mohn (born 1945), a Norwegian judge 
 Hallvard Rieber-Mohn (1922–1982), a Norwegian writer and Dominican priest
 Libe Rieber-Mohn (born 1965), a Norwegian politician for the Labour Party

Other

 Rieber & Søn, a Norwegian food manufacturing company
 GC Rieber, a private company that operates within the fields of marine oils, pelts, salt including for agriculture and nutrients.
 GC Rieber Shipping, a Norwegian shipping company based in Bergen, Norway
 Rieber Hall, a student residence at the University of California, Los Angeles